Malietoa Tanumafili may refer to:

Malietoa Tanumafili I (1879–1939), Samoan leader
Malietoa Tanumafili II (1913–2007), Samoan leader who succeeded his father